Windsor Shades (also known as Ruffin's Ferry and Waterville) is located on the Pamunkey River in Sweet Hall, Virginia, United States, that is listed on the National Register of Historic Places. Archeological native artifacts found on the property surrounding the house suggest it was the site of Kupkipcok, a Pamunkey village noted on John Smith's 1609 map.

Description

The land title is not clear, owing to the destruction of King William County records, but the house is assumed to have been built around 1750. The building is a story-and-a-half, 5 bay gambled roofed, frame structure covered with beaded weatherboards and set on a low, stone and English-bond brick basement. The house has striking massive Flemish - bond brick chimney stacks at either end. In the basement is a large tavern room with reportedly one of the largest interior cooking hearths in Tidewater, Virginia. The site was listed on the National Register of Historic Places in 1978. In 1999 two wings were added on either side of the main block with little alteration of the original structure.

In 1754 Captain Thomas Dansie  established a ferry at the site and operated a tavern in the house. The ferry was in operation until 1927 when a bridge was built in West Point. During the years the house was operated as a tavern with a ferry crossing it was frequented by many notable travelers such as George Washington, who patronized it from the 1750s on his Burgess Route to Williamsburg. In August 1781, the Marquis de Lafayette crossed the Pamunkey by ferry with 4,500 troops. He spent two weeks in King William County, moving between Windsor Shades and Chelsea Plantation. On September 13, 1781, Washington and Rochambeau crossed the Pamunkey at Ruffin's Ferry headed to the battle of Yorktown.

The current owners purchased the property in 1998 and in 2009 donated a historic easement on Windsor Shades and the 14 acres the house sits on to the Virginia Department of Historic Resources.

See also

 National Register of Historic Places listings in King William County, Virginia
 Sweet Hall

References

External links

 Windsor Shade, Pamunkey River, Johnson Landing, King William County, VA: 1 photo at Historic American Buildings Survey

Historic American Buildings Survey in Virginia
Houses on the National Register of Historic Places in Virginia
Houses completed in 1794
Houses in King William County, Virginia
National Register of Historic Places in King William County, Virginia
1794 establishments in Virginia